Darryl Bestall (born 28 May 1952) is a South African cricketer. He played in 113 first-class and 75 List A matches between 1971 and 1988.

References

External links
 

1952 births
Living people
South African cricketers
Eastern Province cricketers
KwaZulu-Natal cricketers
Northerns cricketers
Place of birth missing (living people)